This is a list of international organizations based in Istanbul, Turkey.

List 

| Support for Sustainable Communities || SMIIC ||  || An affiliated institution of the OIC.

 International
Istanbul-related lists
Istanbul, International